Hans Raj Mahila Maha Vidyalaya is a college in Jalandhar, Punjab. The college was founded by Mahatma Hansraj in 1927 in Lahore, Pakistan. After the partition of Indian and Pakistan the school moved to Jalandhar in 1948. The first class consisted of about 80 students compared to 4,650 students in the current class.

The college is managed by the D.A.V. College Managing Committee (DAVMC).currently principal of college is Mrs. Ajay sareen.

Notable alumni
 Sarla Grewal, first woman president of Tribune Trust
 Mrs. Chanchal, first Deputy Director of Sports of Punjab
 Gurveen Sidhu, Deputy Director of National Academy of Audits and Accounts
 J Kakria, ex-principal of HRMMV
 Sarita Verma, principal of B. D. Arya College in Jalandhar
 Usha Kapoor, principal of GND University in Jalandhar
 Neelam Sethi, principal of S. D. College in Gurdaspur
 Sumita Dawra, IAS Officer
 Sarla Bhardwaj, National Sanskrit Literary Award recipient
 Rachna Puri
 Sunita Rani, Arjuna Award and Padma Shree Award recipient
 Surbhi Jyoti, television, Punjabi movie and theatre actress best known for Raula Pai Gaya and Qubool Hai
 Lieutenant Nandita Bhardwaj, Platoon Contingent Commander of the first women contingent of Navy on Republic Day Parade 2015
 Nalini Priyadarshni, poet and writer
 hmv college jalandhar

Awards
 First prize in Zonal Youth Festival at GND University in Amritsar
 GND University Sports Championship (22 years consecutive)
The college also has status of Star College conferred by, Government of India.
The college is also recognized by UGC as a "College of Excellence."
The College has the unique distinction of having been re-accredited with grade A scoring 3.83 (Highest score in India amongst Women Colleges) out of 4 in NAAC accreditation.

External links

 hmv college jalandhar 

Education in Jalandhar
 Women's universities and colleges in Punjab, India